Warren Charles Lewis (10 April 1923 – 8 April 1988) was an Australian rules footballer who played with Melbourne in the Victorian Football League (VFL).

Lewis, who was from Penshurst, was a member of Melbourne's 1941 premiership team, as the 19th man. The 1941 VFL Grand Final was just his fourth league appearance. Military service kept him from playing again until 1944, when he appeared in four more senior games.

References

1923 births
1988 deaths
Australian rules footballers from Victoria (Australia)
Melbourne Football Club players
Australian Army personnel of World War II
Australian Army soldiers
Melbourne Football Club Premiership players
One-time VFL/AFL Premiership players